Tye Morgan (born 4 January 1992) is an English singer and songwriter.

Life and career 
At the age of 16, Morgan signed to Simon Fuller's management company 19 Entertainment (XIX) and signed a record deal with Warner Music Group/679 Recordings at 18 after touring with Marina & The Diamonds on The Family Jewels Tour. She then went on to support Pete Wentz/Black Cards and Janelle Monáe on their UK tours.

In 2017 Morgan signed a deal with Concord Music Group/Karma Artists and later in 2018 co-wrote the Spanish hit Lo Malo which topped the Spanish singles chart and received 5 x platinum certification, as well as reaching gold status in the United States. The song has over 300,000,000 streams to date.

In 2019 Morgan co-wrote the official song for the Cricket World Cup, 'Stand By' with Rudimental and Loryn. She also co-wrote and provided vocals for the lead single from Cashmere Cat's album Princess Catgirl, entitled 'For Your Eyes Only' with Cashmere Cat, Benny Blanco and Francis and The Lights as well as Toby Scott and Paul Harris, which hit number 12 on the Billboard Dance/Electronic charts. Shortly after, Four of Diamonds released the single 'Eating Me Up' which Morgan also co-wrote with Freedo and Tia Rice.

In April 2020, Morgan co-wrote the Michael Calfan and Martin Solveig single 'No Lie' with Toby Scott, Paul Harris and Iman Conta Hultén.

In March 2021, Morgan co-wrote with Jack Morgan and Grades the song 'Mystery' on Super Junior's 'The Renaissance' album, which reached number 1 in 12 countries.

In February 2022, Morgan co-wrote the lead single 'INVU' on Taeyeon's album of the same name. 'INVU' debuted at number one on South Korea's Gaon Digital Chart in the chart issue dated 13–19 February 2022; on its component charts, the song debuted at number one on the Gaon Download Chart, number two on the Gaon Streaming Chart, and number eight on the Gaon BGM Chart. It ascended to number one on the Gaon Streaming Chart in the following week. On the Billboard K-pop Hot 100, the song debuted at number 15 in the chart issue dated 26 February 2022, ascending to number one in the following week.

In May 2022, Morgan featured on 'Gang Gang' alongside DJ Katch. The song was written by Morgan and Freedo and was the first song Morgan sang on as a featured vocalist. Following this, in June 2022, Morgan featured on 'Slide' with Michael Calfan. The song was written by Morgan, Jack Morgan and Freedo.

In June 2022, Morgan launched her own home fragrance company ‘sense of ldn’ which was featured in British Vogue and Country Living in November of the same year.

Discography

Tours
Supporting

The Family Jewels Tour (2010)
Black Cards UK Tour (2010)
Songs from the Tainted Cherry Tree Tour (2010)
The ArchAndroid Tour (2010)

References

External links
Official website

1992 births
Living people
English women guitarists
English guitarists
English pop pianists
English women singer-songwriters
People educated at the BRIT School
British indie pop musicians
Musicians from Liverpool
Singers from London
Warner Music Group artists
Wonky pop musicians
English women pop singers
21st-century English women singers
21st-century English singers
21st-century pianists
21st-century British guitarists
People from Fazakerley
679 Artists artists
21st-century women guitarists
21st-century women pianists